Dunmore is a hamlet in Alberta, Canada within Cypress County, located  southeast of Medicine Hat's city limits on Highway 1 and the Canadian Pacific Railway mainline. A portion of the hamlet is recognized as a designated place by Statistics Canada.

Dunmore is the administrative centre of Cypress County and Prairie Rose School Division No. 8.

The hamlet was named by the CPR after one of its benefactors: Charles Murray, 7th Earl of Dunmore.

Demographics 

Education 
In the southeastern corner of the community is Eagle Butte High School, named after a geographic feature of the Cypress Hills. A one-room schoolhouse in the Cypress Hills was called "Eagle Butte School".

Amenities and services 
Located in the hamlet is Dunmore Park – which has a playground, outdoor hockey rink, baseball field, and a small BMX track. Dunmore has a gas station, a community hall, a storage unit business, a bar and various other small businesses.

See also 
List of communities in Alberta
List of designated places in Alberta
List of former urban municipalities in Alberta
List of hamlets in Alberta

References 

Cypress County
Hamlets in Alberta
Designated places in Alberta
Former villages in Alberta